This is a list of animated television series by episode count. This article does not include animated series that originate from Japan. Shows with over 100 episodes are listed.

Single series

Longest-running animated television franchises

See also
 List of television programs by episode count
 List of anime series by episode count
 List of anime franchises by episode count
 List of animated television series

References

Episode count